The Swiss Institute of Comparative Law ( (ISDC)) is an agency of the federal administration of Switzerland charged with research and consultancy in comparative law. 

Its principal mission is to furnish opinions about foreign law to the administration, the courts and the public. It also operates a publicly accessible research library, which holds 360,000 volumes and served 6,000 visitors in 2008.

The institute was founded through federal statute in 1978. It is located on the campus of the University of Lausanne and is administratively attached to the Federal Department of Justice and Police. It employs a staff of about 30 researchers, librarians and clerical personnel.

See also 
 Lausanne campus
 Law of Switzerland

Notes and references

External links

 Website
 Library catalogue

Federal Department of Justice and Police
Libraries in Switzerland
Comparative law
1978 establishments in Switzerland